The Casco Bay Mailboat is a sailing vessel, run by Casco Bay Lines, which delivers mail and other items to the residents of the islands of Casco Bay in Maine, United States. It is the longest-running mailboat service in the country, having been in existence since the 1870s. Up until the 1950s, the boat was coal-powered; now it runs on a diesel engine.

Currently undertaken by the Maquoit II, one of Casco Bay Lines' three mail boats, the service runs twice daily. The route takes around three hours and visits five islands:

 Little Diamond Island
 Great Diamond Island
 Long Island
 Great Chebeague Island
 Cliff Island

Passengers are permitted on the boat, and tourists can alight at Long Island, Great Chebeague Island and Cliff Island; the Diamonds, meanwhile, are private, with no public beaches, facilities or restaurants. If there are ten or more passengers, a route narration is provided. The route takes them beside landmarks such as Fort Gorges and Luckse Sound, where ships were torpedoed during World War II.

The mailboat is based at the Maine State Pier and departs at 10.00 AM and 2.15 PM.

References 

Ferries of Maine
Casco Bay
Transportation in Portland, Maine
Chebeague Island, Maine